Jan Tauer (born 26 August 1983) is a German former professional footballer who played as a defender.

Career
Tauer was born in Düsseldorf.

He joined Djurgårdens IF from Eintracht Braunschweig at the start of the 2007 season, and made his Allsvenskan debut for Djurgården against IF Brommapojkarna. He scored his first goal for Djurgården against IFK Göteborg when IFK midfielder Niclas Alexandersson tried to clear the ball and hit Tauer in the back, which made the ball to bounce into the goal. Tauer left Djurgården after the 2009 season and signed on 21 December 2009 for VfL Osnabrück.

Personal life
In summer 2017 Tauer returned to Germany from Sweden and joined lower league club DJK Sparta Bilk.

References

External links
 
 Jan Tauer Interview

Living people
1983 births
Footballers from Düsseldorf
German footballers
Association football defenders
Allsvenskan players
2. Bundesliga players
3. Liga players
Fortuna Düsseldorf players
KFC Uerdingen 05 players
Eintracht Braunschweig players
Djurgårdens IF Fotboll players
VfL Osnabrück players
Iraklis Psachna F.C. players
IK Brage players
German expatriate footballers
German expatriate sportspeople in Sweden
Expatriate footballers in Sweden
German expatriate sportspeople in Greece
Expatriate footballers in Greece